Caja Heimann (7 December 1918 – 12 August 1988) was a Danish film actress. She appeared in 23 films between 1940 and 1980. She was born in Copenhagen, Denmark and died in Denmark.

Selected filmography
 I kongens klæ'r (1954)
 Færgekroen (1956)
 Tag til marked i Fjordby (1957)
 Pigen og vandpytten (1958)
 Passer passer piger (1965)

External links

1918 births
1988 deaths
Danish film actresses
Actresses from Copenhagen
20th-century Danish actresses